Juan Cambareri (15 April 1916 - 18 February 1992) (nickname: El Mago del Bandoneón) was a bandoneon player, composer and bandleader (tango musical genre) in Argentina during the Golden Age of tango.

References

1916 births
1992 deaths
Argentine tango musicians